The black rat (Rattus rattus) is a common long-tailed rodent.

Black rat or Rattus rattus may refer to:

 Rattus Rattus (album), a 2005 album by Merzbow
 Black Rat (album), a 2014 album by DZ Deathrays
 Black Rat (film), a 2010 Japanese horror film

See also
 Brown rat (Rattus norvegicus)